The 2015 season for  began in January at the Tour Down Under. As a UCI WorldTeam, they were automatically invited and obligated to send a squad to every event in the UCI World Tour.

On the final day of the 2014 Tour de France the team announced that they had secured new sponsorship for the team with Soudal. Soudal was founded in 1966 and produces a range of sealants, adhesives and foams. Soudal will become a co-naming sponsor for the next six seasons, ensuring the team continues until the 2020 season, the team name becoming Lotto Soudal. Lotto will continue to sponsor the team, as well as the women's team and under-23 team.

Team roster

Riders who joined the team for the 2015 season

Riders who left the team during or after the 2014 season

Season victories

National, Continental and World champions 2015

Footnotes

References

External links
 

2015 road cycling season by team
Lotto–Soudal
2015 in Belgian sport